Staines Town Football Club was an English semi-professional football club based in Staines-upon-Thames, Middlesex. Founded in 1892, it last competed in the Isthmian League, until it was dissolved in 2022.

History

Early days
Staines Town FC was founded in 1892 and was known under various names including Staines F.C.,Staines Albany F.C., 'Staines Lagonda F.C.', and 'Staines Town F.C.', until it folded in 1935. However, prior to World War II the club re-formed as Staines Vale.

In 1953 Staines Town were founder members of the Hellenic League, where they  finished runners-up in 1956. In 1958 they joined the Spartan League and won the title two years later. After finishing second in 1971, Staines Town advanced to the Athenian League, where they won the Second Division title at the first attempt, amassing a record number of points.

Isthmian League
The club were elected to the new Isthmian League Division One in 1973. In their second season, the club finished top and were promoted to the Premier Division. In a nine-year stay, the club's best finish was fourth. However, a ground grading ruling meant that the club were demoted in 1984. The club bounced back five years later only for its Premier Division status to be lost again in 1993 when the club were relegated for the first time in 63 years. Again the club were promoted in 1996 and again it was quickly lost, with the club returning to Division One after only a year.

Having lobbied Spelthorne Council on and off for 20 years, planning permission for a £6.5m conference and health facility was granted in April 2000 and finalised a year later. During construction, Staines groundshared with Walton & Hersham and Egham Town before the return to Wheatsheaf Lane on 22 February 2003.

During 2002–03 and 2003–04, Staines played in Division One South of the Isthmian League and on the last day of season 2003–04, under Steve Cordery, they secured a place in the Premier Division in the newly re-structured pyramid. The Swans spent five seasons in this division before winning promotion to the Conference South in 2009. They had finished second in the league and therefore gained promotion through the play-offs, beating Carshalton Athletic 1–0 in the final at Wheatsheaf Park on 2 May 2009. Louis Wells saved a Carshalton penalty in the 85th minute with Scott Taylor scoring the winning goal in extra time. Staines had also finished as runners up in the previous season, but had lost 2–1 to AFC Wimbledon in the playoff final after taking a first half lead but conceding two late goals in the last seven minutes.

Life in the Conference South
The 2009–10 campaign marked the Swans' first ever appearance in the Conference South and they began their journey brightly, defeating Weston-Super-Mare 0–1 and Dorchester Town 3–0. A home defeat, 1–2, to Havant & Waterlooville was then followed by five consecutive draws and then a 1–3 victory away at St. Albans City. Two significant victories in late October 2009 were beating first place, and at the time unbeaten, Newport County 1–0 at home followed four days later beating third place Thurrock 1–2 away. On Boxing Day 2009, Staines won 4–1 away to rivals Hampton and Richmond Borough, following this up by beating them 4–0 at the Wheatsheaf on New Years Day 2010, with Ali Chaaban scoring a hat-trick. Another significant victory was away at Chelmsford, winning 0–1 through a Marc Charles-Smith goal, Charles-Smith's third goal in a little over 48 hours having scored twice at Dorchester only two days previously. Steve Cordery was named the Conference South manager of the month for January, 2010. Despite a magnificent February and March when Staines Town were in the play-off places, they finished in a very creditable eighth place in their first season in the Conference South.

Cup history
The club have reached the FA Cup first round proper on six occasions, in 1879, 1880, 1984 (losing 2–0 at a Neil Warnock-managed Burton Albion), 2007, 2009 and 2015. In 2007 Staines were drawn away against League Two outfit Stockport County. A crowd of 3,460 saw Staines go behind to a Matty McNeil header but a 76th-minute equaliser from Charles-Smith earned a replay. It was announced on 12 November that the replay would be shown on Sky Sports, resulting in a £75,000 windfall for each club. Staines Town completed the improbable upset as they won the match in penalty kicks (4–3, two magnificent saves by Swans goalkeeper Shaun Allaway, the winning penalty scored by Dave Sargent) after drawing 1–1 in extra time, after having taken the lead in the eighth minute with an Adrian Toppin goal. In the next round they faced Peterborough United at home, and were beaten 5–0. Sir Alex Ferguson (father of Peterborough manager Darren) and Sir Trevor Brooking were among the guests of Staines Town FC on the day.

On 7 November 2009 they beat League Two Shrewsbury Town 0–1 at the Prostar Stadium, Shrewsbury in the 1st Round proper of the F.A. Cup to reach the second round of the competition. The Second Round draw saw Staines Town drawn at home to the winners of the following evening's First Round game of Millwall vs AFC Wimbledon, which Millwall won 4–1.

On 28 November 2009 they earned a place in the 3rd Round Draw for the first time ever after a 1–1 draw against League One Millwall, Ali Chaaban scoring a 79th-minute penalty to level the score after having gone behind ten minutes earlier, in front of a 2,753 crowd. The replay at the New Den was on 9 December and was broadcast live on the FA.com website. A home tie against Championship side Derby County in the 3rd Round awaited the winners of the replay, which Millwall won 4–0.

There have been two appearances in the last 32 of the FA Trophy, the first back in 1976, losing to Morecambe in a 2nd replay and then in a replay to Halifax Town in 2004 after drawing 1–1 at The Shay in the first match.

Another significant match in the club's history was in 1975 when they beat Italian Amateur cup winners Banco di Roma 3–0 on aggregate (1-0 in Rome, 2–0 in Wheatsheaf Lane) for the Barassi Cup.

Staines have also lifted the Middlesex Senior Cup on no fewer than ten occasions. In 1997 under Chris Wainwright, beating Yeading in a penalty shoot out, whilst the Middlesex Charity Cup was lifted in 1994 with a 4–0 win over Northwood. The latest victory in the Middlesex Senior Cup was in 2013 with a 2–0 win over Ashford Town (Middx).

The Carlsberg Cup (an Isthmian League tournament now abolished) was lifted in 1995 against Boreham Wood where the Swans scored a last minute equaliser from the last experimental 'kick in' in English football.

In the London Senior Cup, Staines were runners up in both 1977 and 1981, the earlier final went to a replay versus Wimbledon which 'The Dons' won in their last match as a non-League club.

Recent history
Staines have been involved in a protracted and bitter dispute over the club's land since 2018 with a London-based Investment firm Downing LLP, the club's current ownership has actively defended the club's position using its financial resources. In December 2020, the club's ownership group launched a multimillion-pound bid to buy out the investment firm, believed to be in the region of £2.5 million.  In March 2022, the club said it has suspended its operations due to a dispute with its landlord. The club made several accusations against the investment firm, including breaches of the Modern Slavery Act 2015 which were denied by the firm, the club suspending all primary operations as a result.

Staines were due to take up a place in the Combined Counties League Premier Division North following relegation from Step 4. However, it was announced in July 2022 that their place was taken by Combined Counties Division One side Hilltop. On the same day, the club's website, Twitter account and all other associated social media pages were removed; all but ending 130 years of existence.

Records
Isthmian League Premier Division Play-Offs, 2008–09
FA Cup best performance: Second Round Proper, 2007–08 and 2009–2010
FA Trophy best performance: Fourth Round, 2003–04
Record attendance: 2,860 vs Stockport County, FA Cup first round replay, 22 November 2007
Biggest victory: 14–0 vs Croydon, Isthmian League Division One, 19 March 1994
Heaviest defeat: 1–18 vs Wycombe Wanderers, Great Western Suburban League, 27 December 1909
Most appearances: Dickie Watmore, 840
Most goals: Alan Gregory, 122

Stadium

Wheatsheaf Park was the home of the Staines Town Football Club, situated in Wheatsheaf Lane, Staines-upon-Thames, Middlesex, TW18 2PD. It had been the home of the club since it was purchased in 1951. Like many football stadia, it had changed greatly over time; the most recent of these changes was the development of the main stand in the Wheatsheaf Lane End. Planning permission for this was granted by Spelthorne Council in March 2000, and Staines Town returned to the revamped ground on 22 February 2003. The club boasted a brand new sports bar with Sky Sports football each week and refurbished changing rooms. Wheatsheaf Park was one of the most developed stadiums in its league.

Wheatsheaf Park had a total capacity of 3,009, with 300 seated and 800 in covered terrace. The record league attendance for a match at Wheatsheaf Park was 2,285 vs AFC Wimbledon in 2006. However, one year later Staines had an F.A Cup match against Stockport County and the attendance just crept over the 2,860 mark, setting the club's overall attendance record.

Wheatsheaf Park was also previously the home stadium of Chelsea Ladies Football Club before their move to Kingsmeadow in 2017. In 2015 the ground received its UEFA Stadium Category 1 approval and hosted Chelsea L.F.C home fixtures in the UEFA Women's Champions League.

Club honours 
League

 Athenian League Division Two
 Winners: 1971–72
 Great Western Suburban League Division Two
 Winners: 1920–21
 Isthmian League Division One
 Winners (2): 1974–75, 1988–89
 Isthmian League Premier Play-offs
 Winners: 2008–09
 Spartan League
 Winners: 1959–60
 West London Alliance Division One
 Winners: 1899–1900
 West London League Division One
 Winners: 1900–01
 West Middlesex League
 Winners: 1904–05

Cup

 Barassi Cup
 Winners: 1975–76
 El Cañuelo Trophy
 Winners (4): 1993–94, 1994–95, 1995–96, 1996–97
 Geoff Harvey Memorial Vase
 Winners: 2010–11
 George Ruffell Shield
 Winners: 2010–11
 Jim Lawford Memorial Cup
 Winners: 1999–00
 John Livey Memorial Trophy
 Winners (2): 1993–94, 2013–14
 London Senior Cup
 Runners-up (2): 1976–77, 1980–81
 Lord of Ashford Charity Bowl
 Winners (2): 2001–02, 2010–11
 Melksham Middlesex Charity Shield
 Winners: 1997–98
Merthyr Middlesex Charity Shield
Winners: 1990–91
Middlesex Junior Cup
Winners (2): 1901–02, 1903–04
Middlesex Senior Challenge Cup
Winners (10): 1974–75, 1975–76, 1976–77, 1987–88, 1989–90, 1993–94, 1996–97, 2009–10, 2010–11, 2012–13  
Middlesex Senior Charity Cup
Winners: 1993–94
Southern Combination Challenge Cup
Winners (3): 1964–65, 1966–97, 1994–95
Spartan League Challenge Cup
Winners: 1968–69
 Staines Cottage Hospital Cup
 Winners: 1925–26
 West Middlesex Cup
 Winners: 1924–25

Former players
1. Players that have played/managed in the Football League or any foreign equivalent to this level (i.e. fully professional league).
2. Players with full international caps.
3. Players that hold a club record or have captained the club.
 Adrian Clifton
 Ahmed Abdulla
 Joe Aribo
 Jordaan Brown
 Andy Driscoll
 Dom Dwyer
 Jerel Ifil
 Joe O'Cearuill
 Gary MacDonald
 Andre Scarlett
 Steve Scrivens
 David Silman
 Tim Soutar
 Stephen Wilkins
 Mohamed Bettamer
 James Younghusband
 David Wheeler
 Gordon Hill, who went on to play for Manchester United.

References

External links

Official website

 
Association football clubs established in 1892
Association football clubs disestablished in 2022
National League (English football) clubs
Isthmian League
Parthenon League
Athenian League
Defunct football clubs in Surrey
1892 establishments in England
2022 disestablishments in England
Southern Football League clubs
Defunct football clubs in England